A castellated beam is a beam style where an I-beam is subjected to a longitudinal cut along its web following a specific pattern.

The purpose is to divide and reassemble the beam with a deeper web by taking advantage of the cutting pattern.

References

See also 
 Cellular beam
 Open web steel joist

Structural engineering